Hear It Is is the debut studio album by American rock band The Flaming Lips, released on January 21, 1986 by Restless Records. It marked the official debut of Wayne Coyne on vocals after the departure of his brother Mark Coyne.

Background
In an early interview, the band claimed that the back cover was an image of drummer Richard English's eye when he was on acid.

Track listing

Personnel
The Flaming Lips
Wayne Coyne – lead vocals, guitars
Mike Ivins – bass, backing vocals
Richard English – drums, keyboards, backing vocals
Technical
Randy Burns - engineer
The Flaming Lips - design
Michele Vlasimsky - photography

References

1986 debut albums
The Flaming Lips albums
Restless Records albums